Yeongwol County (Yeongwol-gun) is a county in Gangwon Province, South Korea.

It is well known as the place where King Danjong, the sixth king of the Joseon Dynasty, was exiled when he was forced to abdicate by his uncle, who became Sejo of Joseon. It is also where Danjong was buried after he was murdered in 1457, following the attempts by six martyred ministers to restore him to power, after he was perceived to be a continuing threat to the rule of his uncle. It is also where the Joseon Dynasty poet Kim Sat-gat is buried.

The Korean American actress Jamie Chung has maternal ancestry from Yeongwol County, and is a descendant of the Yeongwol Eom clan.

Cities
Gonggiri

Geology 

The Joseon Supergroup, formed from Cambrian to Ordovician, is distributed in Yeongwol County widely. It consist of the 'Taebaek Group' and 'Yeongwol Group'.

Climate
Yeongwol has a monsoon-influenced humid continental climate (Köppen: Dwa) with cold, dry winters and hot, rainy summers.

Festival 
DongGang International Photo Festival - This festival is held in Yeongwol every year. It features events such as the DongGang Photography Award Exhibition, International Open Call, Photojournalists Exhibition and Gangwon Province Photographers Exhibition. Although it is held at the Dong River Photo Museum, visitors can find the works throughout Yeongwol County during the photo festival.

Gallery

References

External links

 
Yeongwol County tourism office home page

 
Counties of Gangwon Province, South Korea